HMS Torbay (N79) was a T-class submarine of the Royal Navy. She was laid down at Chatham Dockyard and launched on 9 April 1940.

Torbay had an active career, serving mainly in the Mediterranean, although she also served in the Pacific Far East at the end of the war.

Altogether she sank 17 merchant ships, totalling 38,000 tons, plus 5 warships and 24 sailing vessels, and was involved in an attack on Corfu harbour that won her captain, Lieutenant Commander (Lt. Cdr.) Anthony Miers, the Victoria Cross.

Torbay was also involved in two incidents of war crimes.

Service history
Torbay was commissioned on 14 January 1941, under the command of Lt. Cdr. Anthony Miers.

Unable to find them, Torbay was ordered to continue to Gibraltar, and, after another patrol in the Mediterranean, to join the 1st Flotilla at Alexandria.

Mediterranean
From there, Torbay operated for the next 12 months, sinking a number of ships (including the Italian submarine Jantina) and taking part in several special operations.

Some of those special operations revolved around Crete. The Torbay, among others, continued to evacuate Allied stragglers who were not captured and interned as POWs when Crete was surrendered to the Germans on 1 June. On 22 August 1941, after a night run on the surface, 130 men (including 62 New Zealanders and 63 British and Australian troops) crammed aboard the Torbay were safely delivered to Alexandria, Egypt, “establishing a record for the number of people ever jammed into one submarine.” The Torbay’s commander, Lieutenant Commander Anthony ‘Crap’ Miers, VC, was eccentric, and he made it a ritual – ‘Usual Drill, Number One’ – to salute the Vichy French sailors aboard French ships at anchor in Alexandria, Egypt, every time he entered the port. He had his crew assemble on deck and, on order, they dropped their trousers and ‘mooned’ the Vichy French sailors as they entered the harbor.

In July 1941, on her first patrol from Alexandria, Torbay was involved in two incidents of alleged war crimes. On two occasions after sinking enemy ships, Miers had Torbays crew fire on troops as they swam in the water. Miers made no attempt to hide his actions and reported it in his official logs. He received a strongly worded reprimand from the Royal Navy after the first incident.

Torbay was involved in attacks on Axis convoys on two occasions. The attack on the first, on 10 June 1941 involved Torbay making three attack runs on an Italian convoy off the Dardanelles. The first attack failed to produce any results; the second attack resulted in a torpedo hit on the Italian tanker Utilitas but the torpedo failed to explode. In the third attack the Italian tanker Giuseppina Ghirardi was torpedoed and sunk. The attack on the second convoy took place on 12 August 1941, west of Benghazi, Libya. Torbay fired on the Italian merchant ships Bosforo and Iseo but missed both. Torbay was heavily depth charged after these attacks.

In November 1941 Torbay was tasked with landing a party of commandos, under Geoffrey Keyes, for the ill-fated Operation Flipper. On 15 December 1941 Torbay torpedoed an Italian merchant ship in German service, at Methoni in the Peloponnese.

On 4 March 1942 in Corfu Harbour, north-western Greece, Torbay, having followed an enemy convoy into the harbour the previous day, fired torpedoes at a destroyer and two 5,000 ton transports, scoring hits on the two supply ships, which almost certainly sank. Torbay then had a very hazardous withdrawal to the open sea, enduring 40 depth charges. The submarine had been in closely patrolled enemy waters for 17 hours. For this exploit, her commander, Lieutenant Commander Anthony Miers was awarded the Victoria Cross.

Home waters
In mid-1942 Torbay returned to Britain. She returned to the Mediterranean in February 1943 under the command of Lieutenant (Lt.) Robert Clutterbuck.

Return to the Mediterranean
Back in the Mediterranean, Torbay carried out a further series of successful patrols. She also had a close encounter with the German Q-ship GA 45. In October 1943 Torbay's periscope was sighted first by GA 45 which dropped depth charges very close to Torbay. The submarine later surfaced, intending to attack GA 45 with her deck gun, but the German vessel opened fire and forced her to break off the action. GA 45 did not drop any further depth charges (perhaps having run out). Torbay managed to escape damage during this encounter.

As the war in the Mediterranean quietened, Torbay was again reassigned, this time to the Pacific Far East.

Far East
Arriving in May 1945, and under the command of Lt. C.P. Norman, Torbay continued to cause losses amongst enemy shipping. She sank two Japanese sailing vessels and a coaster, and damaged a second coaster, before the end of the war.

Post war
Having survived the war, Torbay was sold on 19 December 1945 and scrapped at Briton Ferry, Wales in March 1947.

Raiding career

Torbay attacked and sank the following ships:-
 Twelve Greek sailing vessels, including Sofia and P III
 The Italian sailing vessels Gesu E Maria, Pozzalo, Columbo, Gesu Giuseppe E Maria and Gesu Crocifisso
 The Italian merchants Citta di Tripoli, Ischia, Maddalena G. and Lido
 Seven German sailing vessels, including L XIV, L I, L XII, L V and L VI
 The 
 The sailing vessel Evangelista
 The German army cargo ship Bellona
 The Italian auxiliary patrol vessels R 113 / Avanguardista, V 90/San Girolamo and V 276 / Baicin
 The German auxiliary submarine chaser 13 V 2 / Delpa II
 The Danish merchant Grete
 The French merchant Lillios
 The Italian fishing vessel Madonna di Porto Salvo
 Two unknown sailing vessels
 The small Italian merchants Versilia and Tarquinia
 A Greek fishing vessel
 The German troopship Kari (the former French Ste. Colette, in turn the former Norwegian Kari)
 A German floating dock
 The German troop transport Palma (the former Italian Polcevera)
 The Spanish merchant Juan de Astigarraga and the French merchant Oasis (Both ships were under German control)
 The Italian ship Aderno (the former British Ardeola)

Torbay also damaged the following ships:-
 The Vichy French tanker Alberta
 The Italian oiler Strombo
 The German merchant Norburg. The damaged ship settled on the bottom of Iraklion harbour but was later salvaged.
 The Italian destroyer . Aviere was already grounded after being damaged on 19 November 1941 by the Polish submarine .
 The Italian auxiliary minesweeper Monte Argentario
 The Italian merchant (in German service) Sebastiano Veniero.
 The Italian merchant (in German service) Trapani. Trapani was further damaged that night by the British escort destroyer  and the Greek escort destroyer .
 An unknown sailing vessel

See also

References

External links

 HMS Torbay, Uboat.net

Publications
 
 
 

 

1940 ships
British T-class submarines of the Royal Navy
Ships built in Chatham
World War II submarines of the United Kingdom